TIFF Bell Lightbox is a cultural centre in Toronto, Ontario, Canada, located in the first five floors of the Bell Lightbox and Festival Tower on the north west corner of King Street and John Street.

TIFF Bell Lightbox features five cinemas, two restaurants, major exhibitions and galleries, a gift shop, rooftop terrace, and learning studios. It is the headquarters for the Toronto International Film Festival, as well as serves throughout the year as a venue for other film screenings and smaller specialty film festivals.

History
TIFF Bell Lightbox opened in 2010, on land donated by Ivan Reitman and family. The venue replaced the Art Gallery of Ontario's Jackman Hall as the primary screening venue of Cinematheque Ontario.

During construction, crews found artifacts belonging to York General Hospital which was located on the site in 1829. TIFF Bell Lightbox opened as a cinema complex, and included the Toronto International Film Festival offices, a ground-floor restaurant and a roof-top terrace are housed in a five-storey structure on King. TIFF Bell Lightbox is built as a part of a five-storey structure that forms a part of the base of Festival Tower.

During the COVID-19 pandemic in Toronto, TIFF launched the Digital TIFF Bell Lightbox, a streaming platform which served both as the primary venue for the online 2020 Toronto International Film Festival and as a rental store for Lightbox-style film programming both before and after the festival.

In November 2022, TIFF announced that Cinema 1, the largest screening room at the Lightbox, will be renamed the Viola Desmond Theatre in 2023.

Facility

TIFF Bell Lightbox is held in the podium, a five-storey complex that forms the base of the Bell Lightbox and Festival Tower. The entrance for the structure's 46-storey tower of condominiums is on John Street, set back from the much smaller 19th-century buildings along King Street.

Podium
As the new headquarters for the Toronto International Film Festival, it contains five cinemas of various sizes, a three-storey public atrium, two galleries, three learning studios, a centre for students and scholars, a bistro, a restaurant, a lounge, a gift shop, and a rooftop terrace. The five-screen cinema complex also includes a film reference library, galleries and workshops.

The theatres present specially-curated programming, as well as some new releases. Some of the films presented tie-in with exhibitions, and retrospectives of actors or filmmakers. The extensive reference library and archives of film, which is open to the public, includes publications and archival movies, as well as research and study space. The podium has been used by the Toronto International Film Festival since 2010. Other events staged at the Lightbox include the Inside Out Film and Video Festival and the imagineNATIVE Film + Media Arts Festival.

Since 2010, TIFF Bell Lightbox has been the home of the festival, marking its permanent move from Yorkville to King West. Future plans include a "Cinema Tower" on the north side on the block, which will contain five additional theatres. The area also includes other prominent venues for the festival, such as Roy Thomson Hall and the Scotiabank Theatre.

The complex opened officially on September 12, 2010 with a block party.  Bruce McDonald's Trigger was the first film screened at the theatre.

Gallery
The galleries host exhibitions related to film and art history. The fourth floor gallery is free to the public, while the larger main gallery on the first level hosts large paid exhibitions. The first exhibition was the MoMA's monograph on Tim Burton, subsequent exhibits have included retrospectives of Federico Fellini, Grace Kelly, James Bond, David Cronenberg, Stanley Kubrick, and most recently, Andy Warhol.

Festival Tower

Festival Tower was developed by The Daniels Corporation and designed by Toronto-based architectural firm Kuwabara Payne McKenna Blumberg Architects (KPMB) and Kirkor Architects. TIFF Bell Lightbox is the home of the Toronto International Film Festival (TIFF), while Festival Tower contains condominium residences. The project was conceived in partnership by the Toronto International Film Festival Group and the King and John Festival Corporation.

Financial support
TIFF is a non-for-profit organization that generates an annual economic impact of $189 million CAD. TIFF Bell Lightbox is supported by contributors including founding sponsor Bell Canada, the Province of Ontario, the Government of Canada, the City of Toronto, the Reitman family (Ivan Reitman, Agi Mandel and Susan Michaels), The Daniels Corporation and Royal Bank of Canada.

See also
 List of tallest buildings in Toronto
 List of tallest buildings in Canada
 VIFF Centre (formerly the Vancouver International Film Centre)

References

External links

Residential skyscrapers in Toronto
Residential condominiums in Canada
Cinemas and movie theatres in Toronto
Toronto International Film Festival
Tourist attractions in Toronto
Residential buildings completed in 2010
Headquarters in Canada
Theatres completed in 2010
KPMB Architects buildings
Festival venues in Canada